NGC 5755 is a barred spiral galaxy in the constellation Boötes, member of Arp 297 interacting galaxies group of four: NGC 5752, NGC 5753, NGC 5754, and NGC 5755.

References

External links
 
 Distance 
 Image NGC 5755
 
SIMBAD data

Boötes
5755
09507
52690
Interacting galaxies
+07-30-063
Barred spiral galaxies